The Selden Motor Vehicle Company was a Brass Era American manufacturer of automobiles.  The company, founded in 1906, was based in Rochester, New York, and built automobiles from 1907 to 1914 and trucks from 1913 to 1932.

History 
The Selden Motor Vehicle Company was founded by George B. Selden, whose 1877 patent was the first U.S. patent of a "horseless carriage" which because of numerous later amendments was not granted until 1895. To make the patent more credible, in 1907 Selden built a car on the lines of the 1877 design. This patent would be declared "unenforceable" in 1911.

E. T. Birdsall designed the first Selden, a 30hp 4-cylinder car placed on the market in June 1907. A car in the $2,000 to $2,500 price range, the Selden grew from a 109-inch wheelbase car to a 125-inch wheelbase.  In 1911 George Selden's patent was declared unenforceable, and his factory had a fire that summer.  Insurance covered the damages and production continued. Late in 1911, the company was reorganized internally, with Frederick A. Law, formerly with Columbia became designer and plant superintendent.  The last Selden passenger cars were built in 1914.

In 1913, the company began production of Selden trucks and this successfully continued until the company's sale to the Hahn Motor Truck Company of Hamburg, Pennsylvania in 1930.  Hahn and Selden went out of business in 1932.  George B. Selden died in 1923.

Advertisements

See also 

 List of defunct automobile manufacturers
 Association of Licensed Automobile Manufacturers
 Electric Vehicle Company

External links 
 1911 Seldon Model 40R at ConceptCarz
 Barnes, J. W. (1981, April). Rochester and the Automobile Industry. Rochester History, XLIII

References 

Cars introduced in 1907
Defunct motor vehicle manufacturers of the United States
Defunct truck manufacturers of the United States
Motor vehicle manufacturers based in New York (state)
Manufacturing companies based in Rochester, New York
Vehicle manufacturing companies established in 1905
Vehicle manufacturing companies disestablished in 1930
1907 establishments in New York (state)
1932 disestablishments in New York (state)
Defunct manufacturing companies based in New York (state)
1900s cars
1910s cars
Brass Era vehicles
American companies disestablished in 1932
American companies established in 1907